Splatter is a 2009 interactive short horror web series directed by Joe Dante produced by Roger Corman and starring Corey Feldman. It was created for Netflix.

The film aired over 3 parts on October 29, November 6 and 13, and was subsequently combined into a single 29 minute segment.  In October 2019, the film website Trailers from Hell released all ten variations of the series, giving the viewer the option of whom to kill next. This is the first time every filmed episode of the series has ever been released to the public.

Plot
After committing suicide, a washed-up rocker returns from the grave to torment the five people who betrayed him in life.

Audiences would get to vote which character lived and died.

Cast
Corey Feldman as Johnny Splatter
Tony Todd as Spencer
Mark Alan as Mortis
Erin Way as Fiona
Tara Leigh as Krule
Stuart Pankin as Dr. Bellows

Production
Netflix approached Roger Corman with the project.

Corman tried to hire Richard Matheson to write the script but he was busy and recommended his son, Richard Christian Matheson. The director was Joe Dante, with whom Corman had worked in the 1970s.

The series was shot over eight days at a mansion in the Hollywood Hills.

The original intention was to shoot the first installment and then wait a day for the audience votes to be tabulated before write, shoot, edited and post produce the next one over six days. “I wanted to see if I could do this stuff again,” said Corman, who had made feature films in such short time spans before. However he soon realized it would be too logistically difficult. His wife proposed a solution. "We would shoot the deaths of all five and then, as the votes come in, we may do a little pick-up shooting to tie things together,” Corman says. “Then we would edit the deaths in.”

“We have to have everything ready for when the first vote happens,” says Joe Dante. “When the first vote happens, we have to have a rough version of all of these different possibilities and the same thing for the third week. You have to shoot everything three times. There are all of these logistical issues you have to carry around in your head.”

Dante later recalled:

Dante says that making the film was challenging:

There were ten episodes in all. "The first episode is always the same, and then the others vary depending on the audience vote," says Dante. "There are more versions again of the last episode than the middle. The exact details escape me, because I probably never quite understood them anyway!"

References

External links
 

English-language Netflix original programming
Splatter_(TV_Series)
Horror fiction web series